The 2017 Wiltshire Council election took place on 4 May 2017 as part of the 2017 local elections in the United Kingdom. All 98 councillors were elected from electoral divisions which returned one councillor each by first-past-the-post voting for a four-year term of office.

Composition before election

Uncontested election
At the close of nominations on 4 April 2017, there was one electoral division in which only one candidate had come forward: John Smale (Conservative), in Bulford, Allington and Figheldean. He was thus elected unopposed.

Results summary

|}

Electoral division results 

The electoral division results listed below are based on the changes from the 2013 elections, not taking into account any party defections or by-elections.

Aldbourne and Ramsbury

Alderbury and Whiteparish

Amesbury East

Note: Jamie Paul Capp had previously gained the seat for the Liberal Democrats in a 2016 by-election.

Amesbury West

Bourne and Woodford Valley

Box and Colerne

Bradford-on-Avon North

Bradford-on-Avon South

Brinkworth

Bromham, Rowde and Potterne

Note: Anna Louise Cuthbert had previously held the seat for the Conservative Party in a 2015 by-election.

Bulford, Allington and Figheldean

Burbage and The Bedwyns

By Brook

Note: Jane Scott retired in February 2020.

Calne Central

Calne Chilvester and Abberd

Calne North

Calne Rural

Calne South and Cherhill

Chippenham Cepen Park and Derriads

Chippenham Cepen Park and Redlands

Chippenham Hardenhuish

Note: Melody Rhonda Thompson had previously gained the seat for the Conservative Party in a 2015 by-election.

Chippenham Hardens and England

Chippenham Lowden and Rowden

Chippenham Monkton

Chippenham Pewsham

Chippenham Queens and Sheldon

Corsham Pickwick

Corsham Town

Corsham Without and Box Hill

Cricklade and Latton

Devizes and Roundway South

Devizes East

Devizes North

Downton and Ebble Valley

Durrington and Larkhill

Note: Graham Wright had previously been elected in 2013 for the Liberal Democrats. The change in his voteshare shown is the change from the voteshare he won as a Liberal Democrat in 2013.

Ethandune

Note: Jerry Wickham had previously held the seat for the Conservatives in a 2014 by-election.

Fovant and Chalke Valley

Hilperton

Holt and Staverton

Kington

Laverstock, Ford and Old Sarum

Ludgershall and Perham Down

Lyneham

Malmesbury

Marlborough East

Marlborough West

Melksham Central

Melksham North

Melksham South

Melksham Without North

Melksham Without South

Mere

Minety

Nadder and East Knoyle

Pewsey

Pewsey Vale

Purton

Redlynch and Landford

Roundway

Royal Wootton Bassett East

Royal Wootton Bassett North

Royal Wootton Bassett South

Salisbury Bemerton

Salisbury  Fisherton and Bemerton Village

Salisbury Harnham

Salisbury St Edmund and Milford

Note: Atiqul Hoque had previously gained the seat for the Conservative Party in a 2015 by-election.

Salisbury St Francis and Stratford

Salisbury St Marks and Bishopdown

Salisbury St Martins and Cathedral

Salisbury St Pauls

Sherston

Southwick

Summerham and Seend

The Collingbournes and Netheravon

The Lavingtons and Erlestoke

Tidworth

Till and Wylye Valley

Tisbury

Trowbridge Adcroft

Trowbridge Central

Trowbridge Drynham

Trowbridge Grove

Note: Chris Auckland had previously gained the seat for the Liberal Democrats in a 2016 by-election.

Trowbridge Lambrok

Trowbridge Park

Trowbridge Paxcroft

Urchfont and The Cannings

Warminster Broadway

Warminster Copheap and Wylye

Warminster East

Warminster West

Warminster Without

West Selkley

Westbury East

Westbury North

Westbury West

Wilton and Lower Wylye Valley

Winsley and Westwood

Winterslow

Note: In 2013, Christopher Devine had won the seat unopposed as a Conservative candidate.

By-elections between 2017 and 2021

Trowbridge Drynham

Westbury North

Ethandune

Melksham Without South

Trowbridge Lambrok

Till and Wylye Valley

By-election not held 
Jane Scott retired as councillor for By Brook in February 2020, following her appointment to a government role in the House of Lords. The seat remained vacant until the full local elections in May 2021, since the COVID-19 lockdown restrictions prevented the holding of by-elections.

References

2017
2017 English local elections
2010s in Wiltshire